Many radio stations currently use the brand K-Hits:
WBMX, Chicago, Illinois, USA
KHTT, Tulsa, Oklahoma, USA
KADD, Logandale, Nevada, USA
KTHI, Caldwell, Idaho, USA
KHYT, Tucson, Arizona, USA
KPKL, Deer Park, Washington, USA
KZID, Culdesac, Idaho, USA
KHTE-FM, Little Rock, Arkansas, USA
KCCL, Woodland, California, United States

Stations that used to use this branding:
KHIT-FM, Madera, California, USA
KHTZ, Los Angeles, California, USA
KGLK, Lake Jackson, Texas, USA
KHHT, Denver, Colorado, USA
KIHT, St. Louis, Missouri, USA
KLTH, Portland, Oregon, USA
KMJE (FM), Placerville, California, USA
KMXP, Phoenix, Arizona, USA
KLYY, Riverside, California, USA